Piché: The Landing of a Man is a Canadian drama film, directed by Sylvain Archambault and released in 2010. The film is based on the true story of Robert Piché, an airline pilot who successfully landed Air Transat Flight 236 in the Azores after the plane lost engine power mid-air.

The film stars Michel Côté as Piché, with Côté's real-life son Maxime Le Flaguais playing the younger Piché in flashbacks. The cast also includes Normand D'Amour, Sophie Prégent, Sarah-Jeanne Labrosse and Isabelle Guérard.

The film received two Genie Award nominations at the 31st Genie Awards, for Best Cinematography (Ronald Plante) and Best Editing (Yvann Thibaudeau).

References

External links 
 

2010 films
2010 drama films
Canadian drama films
Drama films based on actual events
Films directed by Sylvain Archambault
Biographical films about aviators
French-language Canadian films
2010s Canadian films